Chamran (also Romanized as Chamrān) is a city in the Central District of Mahshahr County, Khuzestan Province, Iran.  At the 2006 census, its population was 18,519, in 3,935 families.

References

Populated places in Mahshahr County

Cities in Khuzestan Province